Yury Ponomaryov may refer to:

Yury Ivanovich Ponomaryov (1946–2020), Russian politician
Yury Anatolyevich Ponomaryov (1932–2005), Soviet cosmonaut
Yury Valentinovich Ponomaryov (born 1946), Russian banker